Shafie Zahari (born 3 January 1993 in Pahang) is a Malaysian footballer currently playing for Shahzan Muda FC in FAM League.

External links
 Striker Shafie not satisfied despite scoring for Pahang
 Harimau Muda Team Info
 

Living people
1993 births
People from Pahang
Malaysian people of Malay descent
Malaysian footballers
Association football forwards
Sri Pahang FC players